The Perfect Family may refer to:
 The Perfect Family (2011 film), a comedy-drama film directed by Anne Renton
 The Perfect Family (2021 film), a Spanish comedy film directed by Arantxa Echevarría
 The Perfect Family (Flashpoint), an episode of Flashpoint